Sarrig or Sar Rig, also rendered as Sarig, Sarriq and Sarrik, may refer to:

Sar Rig, Bandar Abbas, Hormozgan Province
Sar Rig, Minab, Hormozgan Province
Sar Rig, Qeshm, Hormozgan Province
Sar Rig-e Dum, Hormozgan Province
Sar Rig-e Owl, Hormozgan Province
Sar Rig-e Sum, Hormozgan Province
Sar Rig, Kerman
Sarrig, Sistan and Baluchestan